British Biographical Index in four vols. Edited by David Bank and Anthony Esposito. London: K.G. Saur. It is the key to the British Biographical Archive. Edited by Laureen Baillie and Paul Sieveking. Munich: K.G. Saur, 1984-. 1236 fiches.

The collection includes 330,000 biographical entries from 324 reference books originally published between 1601 and 1929. Most major reference libraries have it. In digital online form, it forms part of the World Biographical Information System Online

British biographical dictionaries